Joseph Privat de Molières (26 May 1676 – 12 May 1742) was a French physicist and mathematician, a member of the Académie des sciences and professor at the Collège royal.

Biography
Joseph Privat de Molières was born in Tarascon. He died in Paris.

Publications
 Leçons de mathématique nécessaires pour l'intelligence des principes de physique qui s'enseignent actuellement au Collège royal, 1725
 Leçons de physique contenant les éléments de la physique déterminés par les seules lois des mécaniques, expliquées au Collège royal de France, 4 vol., 1734–1739
 Traité synthétique des lignes du premier et du second genre, ou Éléments de géométrie dans l'ordre de leur génération. Ces lignes sont la ligne droite, le cercle, l'ellipse, la parabole & l'hyperbole, 1740
 « Dissertation posthume sur l'existence de la force centrale dans un tourbillon sphérique » in Principes du système des petits tourbillons, mis à la portée de tout le monde et appliqués aux phénomènes les plus généraux par Jean-Baptiste Le Corgne de Launay, 1743

Histoire de l'Académie royale des sciences
 Sur la conciliation des deux règles astronomiques de Kepler dans le système des tourbillons, dans Histoire de l'Académie royale des sciences – Année 1733, Imprimerie royale, Paris, 1735,  
 Sur les mouvements en tourbillon, dans Histoire de l'Académie royale des sciences – Année 1728, chez Durand, Paris, 1753,  
 Sur les tourbillons célestes, dans Histoire de l'Académie royale des sciences – Année 1729, Imprimerie royale, 1731, 
 Sur la résistance de l'éther au mouvement des corps, dans Histoire de l'Académie royale des sciences – Année 1731, chez Panckoucke, Paris, 1764,

Mémoires de l'Académie royale des sciences
 Loix générales du mouvement dans le tourbillon sphérique. Lemmes, dans Mémoires de l'Académie royale des sciences – Année 1728, chez Durand, Paris, 1753,  
 Problème physico-mathématique dont la solution tend à servir de réponse à une des objections de M. Newton contre la possibilité de tourbillons calesses, dans Mémoires de l'Académie royale des sciences – Année 1729, Imprimerie royale, Paris, 1731,  
 Les loix astronomiques des vitesses des planètes dans leurs orbes expliquées méchaniquement dans le système du plein, dans Mémoires de l'Académie royale des sciences – Année 1733, Imprimerie royale, Paris, 1735,

References

1676 births
1742 deaths
18th-century French mathematicians
18th-century French physicists
People from Tarascon
Members of the French Academy of Sciences
Academic staff of the Collège de France
Oratorians